Future Wars, subtitled in Europe as Time Travellers and in North America as Adventures in Time and known in France as Time Travelers: The Menace is an adventure game from Delphine Software International, released in 1989. The game is mainly the work of Paul Cuisset (story and programming) and Éric Chahi (graphics). The game was supposed to be the first of a series of adventure games revolving around time traveling but later episodes were never made.

Gameplay
Future Wars is played by left-clicking for character movement, and right-clicking for character actions. The actions available in the right-click popup menu are: Operate, Examine, Take, Use and Inventory. "Use" had a subcategory which enabled the player to drag and select the items in their inventory.

Plot
The player starts the game as a window cleaner dressed in white overalls who is in the middle of cleaning the outside of a skyscraper. According to later references, the game starts in 1989 (also when Future Wars was first retailed).

The player character is not given a name throughout the game. The game cursor identifies him only as "hero". He is cleaning the windows on an electric elevator platform attached to the exterior of the building when "Ed the boss" opens a window and reprimands him for kicking the bucket by banging his fist against the window ledge and shouting. The player then can enter the building and, while playing a prank on Ed, he discovers a secret passage leading to a machine room. There he acquires some documents in an alien language which he keeps in the inventory.

The device takes the player to the year 1304, where the hero has the chance to rescue a damsel in distress from dubious monks. He learns then that she is Lo'Ann, a time traveler who came with her father Lear to thwart an alien plot to plant a long-delay time bomb, and he helped them to succeed in their mission against the Crughons. However, by learning things he should not, he must be taken to the Supreme Council of the future so that his fate is decided.

The player is then taken to forty-fourth century to meet the council during an attack by the Crughons. After a minor mishap and subsequently having to make his way through the ravaged city of Paris II, the hero eventually gets aboard a shuttle that would take him to the council's city, only to be kidnapped by the Crughons. He is rescued by Earth forces but he is accused of being a Crughon spy as he is carrying the Crughon documents with him; he is only saved from execution by Lo'Ann who informs the Council.

The Council then explains history to the player: humans had abandoned Earth and were living in colonies when the war with the Crughons erupted a century ago. The war pushed them to rehabilitate the abandoned Earth. They built a "time-space energy shield" system called S.D.I. "in memory of the past" which prevents the Crughons both from attacking Earth and also teleporting themselves through time travel. However, the Crughons managed to visit Earth in different periods of the past and plant three time bombs in the location of the future three generators of S.D.I. Once activated, the bombs cannot be defused and the only option is to prevent the Crughons from planting them. For now, Lo'Ann managed to defuse one of them with the hero's help in the Middle Ages. However the one from the hero's era detonated, allowing the Crughons to attack. Thanks to the documents the hero was carrying, the Council determined that the third bomb was planted in the Cretaceous period.

The hero and Lo'Ann then travel there to foil the Crughon's attempt. After an arcade sequence and the wounding of Lo'Ann, the hero boards their spacecraft and travels to their headquarters to detonate the bomb prematurely. The game ends when, after succeeding in detonating the bomb long before hominids even evolve (and providing an alternate explanation for the Cretaceous–Paleogene extinction event), the hero returns to the forty-fourth century to fight further battles against the Crughons.

Reception

Upon release, Future Wars received positive reviews.

Computer Gaming Worlds Allen Greenberg praised the game's story as good, its graphics as "very imaginative and at times absolutely striking" and its musical score as "a respectable soundtrack which many will consider superior to most of those composed and released for theatrical films" but stated the same graphical detail was frequently hiding important objects vital to solving the game and hindering the player's movement in certain cases. It also criticized the Cinematique engine as "not quite the innovation Future War's designers claim it to be—similar features have appeared in games by Sierra as well as Lucasfilm."

References

External links

1989 video games
Adventure games
Amiga games
Atari ST games
Delphine Software International games
DOS games
Golden Joystick Award winners
NEC PC-9801 games
Point-and-click adventure games
Science fiction video games
ScummVM-supported games
X68000 games
U.S. Gold games
Video games about time travel
Alternate history video games
Video games developed in France
Video games scored by Jean Baudlot
Video games set in 1989
Video games set in the 14th century
Video games set in the Middle Ages